Vellamo, also spelled Wellamo, is the goddess of water, lakes and seas in Finnish mythology.

Vellamo is said to be tall and beautiful, and is much respected by fishermen, who pray to her for good fishing luck. Vellamo can also control the winds to help sailors, and she controls the storms and waves. Vellamo has magical cows that live on underwater fields. Sometimes, during the morning mist, she brings her cows above the surface to eat water hay. Vellamo wears a blue dress that is made from sea foam.

The name "Vellamo" comes from the Finnish word 'velloa', which means 'movement of water and waves'. Vellamo's husband is the Finnish sea god Ahti.

The , which is located in the city of Kotka, Finland, is named after Vellamo.

In popular culture
Ambient Folk artist Archaic Earth has a track "Vellamo's Song" on the EP Hiraeth

Further reading
 Suomen sanojen alkuperä, Finnish Literature Society, 2000. (in Finnish)

References

Finnish goddesses
Sea and river goddesses